Box of Death (주검의 상자 - Jugeomeui sangja) is a 1955 South Korean film directed by Kim Ki-young. It was the celebrated director's debut film, and the first Korean film to use synchronous sound.

Synopsis
An anti-communist film about a plot to stir up pro-communist sympathies through an act of terrorism. A young village man foils the plot by infiltrating the communist camp and blowing it up instead.

Cast
 Choi Moo-ryong
 Kang Hyo-shil
 No Neung-geol
 Choi Nam-Hyun
 Kim Myung-soon
 Sin Dong-hun
 Ju In-seon

Notes

Bibliography
 
 
 

1955 films
1950s Korean-language films
Films directed by Kim Ki-young
South Korean political films
1955 directorial debut films
South Korean black-and-white films
South Korean action films
1950s action films